The Women's 400 metres T12 event at the 2012 Summer Paralympics took place at the London Olympic Stadium from 2 to 4 September. The event consisted of 4 heats, 2 semifinals and a final.

Records
Prior to the competition, the existing World and Paralympic records were as follows:

Results

Round 1
Competed 2 September 2012 from 12:14. Qual. rule: winner of each heat (Q) plus the 4 fastest other times (q) qualified.

Heat 1

Heat 2

Heat 3

Heat 4

Semifinals
Competed 3 September 2012 from 11:03. Qual. rule: winner of each heat (Q) plus the two fastest other times (q) qualified.

Heat 1

Heat 2

Final
Competed 4 September 2012 at 21:15.

 
Q = qualified by place. q = qualified by time. PB = Personal Best. SB = Seasonal Best.

References

Athletics at the 2012 Summer Paralympics
2012 in women's athletics